Vauthiermont is a commune in the Territoire de Belfort department in Bourgogne-Franche-Comté in northeastern France.

Geography
A part of the village is located on the line of watershed, between the Mediterranean sea and the North sea.

See also

Communes of the Territoire de Belfort department

References

External links
Official website 

Communes of the Territoire de Belfort